The United States Military Academy (USMA) is an undergraduate college in West Point, New York with the mission of educating and commissioning officers for the United States Army. The list is drawn from non-graduate former cadets and cadet candidates. It is not unusual for the service academies to have high dropout rates. Of the original 103 cadets in the Class of 1826, only 43 graduated. Non-graduates of the Academy have entered a variety of fields. Notable non-graduates include Edgar Allan Poe (literature), James Abbott McNeill Whistler (art), Maynard James Keenan (music), Adam Vinatieri (football), and even the military: Jacob Zeilin, Lewis Addison Armistead, and Courtney Hodges.



Non-graduates
As these alumni did not graduate, their class year represents the year they would have graduated if they had completed their education at the Academy.

See also 
 List of United States Military Academy alumni
 Knights Out

References

Academy alumni, famous list
Non
West Point